Artista Academy is a Philippine talent and reality show aired on TV5. Hosted by Cesar Montano and Marvin Agustin in cooperation with the Asian Academy of Television Arts (AATA), it premiered on July 30, 2012. The show aims to find new talented actors and actresses, with  worth of prizes and an artist management contract at stake. The show had its one-time Grand Audition at the Smart Araneta Coliseum on June 19, 2012 for all aspirants between 16 and 22 years old. The show ended on October 27, 2012 through the "awards night" at the Smart Araneta Coliseum, having Vin Abrenica and Sophie Albert as winners.

Each of the 16 aspirants will undergo training at the AATA as special scholars. Noted experts from the Philippine entertainment industry and veteran artists will tutor the candidates.

Faculty

Hosts
Cesar Montano (Artista Academy Live Exams)
Marvin Agustin (Artista Academy Primetime)
Mr. Fu (Close-Up Artista Academy Breaktime)
Valeen Montenegro (Close-Up Artista Academy Breaktime / Live Exams)

Executive committee
Mac Alejandre
Wilma Galvante
Perci Intalan

Live exam critics
Lorna Tolentino
Gelli de Belen
Wilma Galvante
Mac Alejandre

Academy advisers
Joel Lamangan
Louie Ocampo
Georcelle Dapat-Sy

Guest mentors
Boots Anson-Roa
Leo Martinez
Moy Ortiz
Soxie Topacio
Lorna Tolentino

Top 16 students

Elimination chart

Color Keys

  – Top 8 scholar male students
  – Top 8 scholar female students
  – Top scholar student in the Live and Final Exam; Scholar student advanced to the Finals
  – Received a Special Award
  – Proclaimed as the Grand Winner (Best Actor/Best Actress)

  – Final 6 scholar student
  – Wildcard Finalist and advanced to the Finals
  – Previously Kicked out and then competed as a Wildcard Finalist
  – Ranked as one of the Bottom group
  – Kicked out (Eliminated)
  – Dropped out (Withdraw/Quit/Ejected)

Notes

 No eliminations, but there was the Overall Bottom Three.
 Alejo and Quisumbing were hospitalized, therefore they were absent on the live exam and got 50. They were relegated automatically to the Bottom Five.
 No eliminations, the Overall Top Three and Bottom Three were not revealed. Special awards were given to Chanel and Alberto, the Most Confident and Most Improved, respectively.
 There was a mass kick-out. The Overall Top Three was not revealed.
 Four of the scholars advanced to the Finals. There will be a play-off for the last two Final seats between the four others (Danger 4), plus six wild card contenders (Tropang Kick out).
 Play-off for the last two Final seats between the four others, plus six wild card contenders.

Ratings

See also
List of programs aired by TV5 (Philippine TV network)

References

External links

TV5 Rewind: Artista Academy on YouTube - Collection of the show's past episodes

TV5: Artista Academy | 10 MILLION PESOS could be yours! at the official PinoyExchange Forum

Philippine reality television series
2012 Philippine television series debuts
2012 Philippine television series endings
TV5 (Philippine TV network) original programming
Filipino-language television shows